Triskell is a project portfolio management (PPM) software developed by Triskell Software LLC. It is a collaborative software that allows enterprises to manage all perspective of their business like projects, products, risks, works, budgets, etc.

Software
Triskell is a web-based (SaaS) project management software (collaborative software) that provides tools to manage projects and portfolios, workflow, resources and tasks.

Features
As it is a web application there is only one version of the program, which is regularly updated. Triskell implemented improvements are available to all users equally and simultaneously.
Some of the features that includes Triskell are:
Multiple Portfolios.
Multiple Organizations.
Advanced Object Modelization.
Lifecycles & Workflows.
Time-Phased Attributes for Budgeting & Resourcing.
Custom Attributes & Panels per Object.
Change Tracking & History.
Scorecards on every Object.
Graphs and Masterplan on every Object.
Advanced Staffing & Resourcing.
Gantt Chart.
Agile.
Multi-criteria Scoring on every Object.
Scenarios & Simulations on every Object.
Template Library.
Time Booking.
Dynamic Datamart for Reporting.
Dynamic Collaboration between Users.

See also
 Comparison of project management software

References

External links
 
 http://triskell.widegroup.cl/
Project management software
Business software
Collaborative software